The Nicarao people were a Nahuat-speaking Mesoamerican people who migrated from central and southern Mexico over the course of several centuries from approximately 700 CE onwards. Around 1200 CE, the Nicarao split from the Pipil people and moved into what is now Nicaragua. The migration of the Nicarao has been linked to the collapse of the important central-Mexican cities of Teotihuacan and Tula, as well as the Classic Maya collapse. The Nicarao settled in several pockets throughout western Nicaragua, particularly around the western shores of Lake Nicaragua. The Nicarao shared many blended cultural traits with both indigenous North American and Mexican belief systems as well as their Toltec parent tribe, including an identical Toltec calendar, similar organizational treaties, the use of screenfold books, the worship of the Great Spirit and closely-related deities, Nagual mysticism and practice of Tonal spirituality.

The Nicarao were first contacted by the Spanish in 1522 CE, initiating the Spanish conquest of Nicaragua. At the time of contact, they were ruled by a cacique that the Spanish called Nicarao, who governed from his capital Quauhcapolca, not far from the modern town of Rivas. At that time, the Nicarao had a sizeable population concentrated in nucleated villages. Within a century of European contact, the Nicarao were effectively dismantled as a tribal Confederation by the Spanish incursion.

Origin and distribution
The Nicarao people migrated from central and southern Mexico over the course of several centuries from approximately 700 CE onwards. Around 1200 CE, the Nicarao split from the Pipil people and moved into what is now Nicaragua. The beginning of this series of migrations was likely to have been linked to the collapse of the great central-Mexican city of Teotihuacan, and later with the collapse of the Toltec city of Tula. The dating of Nicarao arrival in what is now Nicaragua has also been linked to the Classic Maya collapse, with the cessation of Maya influence in the region, and the rise of cultural traits originating in the Valley of Mexico. The Nicarao settled in several pockets distributed through western Nicaragua, and possibly also extended into what is now northwestern Costa Rica. They are believed to have displaced the Chorotega inhabitants that had previously settled the region. The Nicarao appear to have seized control of the most productive land around the western portions of Lake Nicaragua, and the Gulf of Fonseca. The area now covered by Rivas Department appears to have been conquered by the Nicarao shortly before the Spanish conquest.

Major settlements
At the time of contact with the Spanish, the Nicarao were governed from their capital at Quauhcapolca, near the modern town of Rivas. Other principal settlements included Mistega, Ochomogo, Oxmorio, Papagayo, Tecoatega, Teoca, Totoaca, and Xoxoyota.

Spanish contact
When the Spanish first encountered the Nicarao in 1522 CE, they inhabited the Isthmus of Rivas. Their ruler was referred to in later sources as Nicarao, and the capital city was Quauhcapolca. The Nicarao had a sizeable population concentrated in nucleated villages. The Nicarao experienced complete demographic collapse within the first century after the Spanish conquest of Nicaragua, from a combination of disease and being sold into slavery. A remnant Nahua-speaking population may have existed as late as the mid-19th century, but the Nicarao as a tribal Confederation are now extinct. However, some of their practices and beliefs continue to survive among their displaced ancestors within the indigenous people of Central America and Nicaragua.

Culture
Spanish chronicler Gonzalo Fernández de Oviedo y Valdés, writing soon after the conquest, recorded that the Nicarao practised cranial modification, by binding the heads of young children between two pieces of wood. Archaeologists have unearthed pre-Columbian burials in the former Nicarao region with evidence of both cranial and dental modification. The Nicarao possessed a number of cultural traits in common with the Toltecs of central Mexico, including an identical calendar, the use of screenfold books, worship of the Great Spirit and a Toltec pantheon of deities, Tonal mythology, Nagual mysticism, and treaties. They also, in common with their Mexican cousins from Aztec culture, practiced ritual confession, and the volador (flying men) ritual.

Notes

References

Fowler, William R. Jr. (Winter 1985). "Ethnohistoric Sources on the Pipil-Nicarao of Central America: A Critical Analysis". Ethnohistory. Duke University Press. 32 (1): 37–62. ISSN 0014-1801. . . Retrieved 2017-06-27. 
Healy, Paul (2006a) [1980]. A Proposed Culture History of the Rivas Region in Archaeology of the Rivas Region, Nicaragua. pp. 329–341. Waterloo, Ontario, Canada: Wilfrid Laurier University Press. . 
Healy, Paul (2006b) [1980]. A Brief History of the Culture Subarea in Archaeology of the Rivas Region, Nicaragua. pp. 19–34. Waterloo, Ontario, Canada: Wilfrid Laurier University Press. . 
McCafferty, Geoffrey G.; and McCafferty, Sharisse D. (2009). "Crafting the Body Beautiful: Performing Social Identity at Santa Isabel, Nicaragua" in Halperin, Christina T., Katherine A. Faust, Rhonda Taube, Aurore Giguet, Elizabeth M. Brumfiel, and Lisa Overholtzer (eds.). Mesoamerican Figurines. pp. 297–323. Gainesville, Florida, US: University Press of Florida. Archived from the original on 2017-07-17. .
McCafferty, Geoffrey (2015). "The Mexican Legacy in Nicaragua, or Problems when Data Behave Badly". Archeological Papers of the American Anthropological Association 25 (1): 110–118.
Salamanca, Danilo (2012) "Los dos rostros indígenas de Nicaragua y Centroamérica". Wani, Revista del Caribe Nicaragüense. 65: 6–23. Bluefields, Nicaragua: Bluefields Indian & Caribbean University/Centro de Investigaciones y Documentacion de la Costa Atlántica (BICU/CIDCA). ISSN 2308-7862. 

Mesoamerican people
History of Nicaragua
Extinct ethnic groups
Indigenous peoples in Nicaragua
Mesoamerican cultures
Native American genocide